The Twain–Ament indemnities controversy was a major  in the United States of America in 1901 as a consequence of the published reactions of American humorist Mark Twain to reports of Rev. William Scott Ament and other missionaries collecting indemnities (in excess of losses) from Chinese people in the aftermath of the Boxer Uprising.

Origins of the Controversy
In 1900, attacks took place across China in connection with the Boxer Rebellion which targeted Christians and foreigners. Many missionaries with their children, as well as native Christians were killed and much property was destroyed. While most missionaries, including those of the largest affected mission agency, the China Inland Mission led by Hudson Taylor, refused to even accept payment for loss of property or life "in order to demonstrate the meekness of Christ to the Chinese" when the allied nations were demanding compensation from the Chinese government, not all missionaries acted with similar restraint.

In 1901, veteran American Board of Commissioners for Foreign Missions missionary Rev. Dr. William Scott Ament, who had served in China since 1877, became embroiled in a controversy regarding his activities (and those of other Christian missionaries, including Pierre-Marie-Alphonse Favier, Roman Catholic Vicar Apostolic of Northern Chi-li) subsequent to the Boxer Uprising. "In the war's aftermath came a war of words. Missionary triumphalism clashed with the sarcastic sallies of Mark Twain, who lampooned the apologias for looting given by American missionary William Scott Ament."

Ament's attitude and actions
While Ament through his own personal initiative was able to rescue the ABCFM missionaries at Tungchow, there was still significant loss of lives. Thirteen ABCFM adult missionaries and five children were killed by the Boxers. Included were Mary Susan Morrill (born 1863 in Portland, Maine) and Annie Allender Gould, were among the eleven foreign missionaries, four children, and about fifty Chinese Christians killed in Baoding from 30 June 1900. Additionally, there was much damage to ABCFM property. The ABCFM Mission compound was razed, as was the Emily Ament Memorial School (named in honour of Ament's daughter) on Sixth Street, Peking. Ament estimated that by the end of July 1900 that losses for the ABCFM Peking station was about $71,000 gold.

Occupation of the Mongolian Fu
On 11 August 1900, Ament indicated in a letter to his wife, that:

Ament was able to occupy the Mongolian Fu, a suspected Boxer headquarters adjacent to the ABCFM chapel, by 20 August 1900. Ament was able to write to his wife:

Demand for indemnities
On 20 August 1900, Ament with nineteen other American Protestant missionaries sent a note to United States Minister, Edwin H. Conger, demanding: 

These demands were transmitted to John Hay (8 October 1838; 1 July 1905), United States Secretary of State (1898–1905), with only the demands for indemnities and the abolition of the examination system ultimately included in the Boxer Protocol. According to Wong:

On 25 August 1900, Ament revealed his plans to punish the Boxers for their actions:

Again, Ament indicated:

Collection of indemnities
From 13 September 1900, Ament, and a colleague, Reverend Elwood Gardner Tewksbury (born 1865, West Newbury, Massachusetts), accompanied by the U.S. 6th Cavalry, searched the areas adjacent to Beijing for Boxers, collecting indemnities for Christians who had been killed by the Boxers, and ordering the burning of some homes and even allegedly executing suspected Boxers. Ament had been chosen by his fellow missionaries "as the one who would be honorable and just to all." Ament reported to Mary, his wife, on 18 September 1900:

On 1 January 1901, Ament, writing to his wife, confided:

Ament is quoted as advocating the necessity of the use of force to ensure genuine regret among the Chinese: "If you deal with the Chinese with a soft hand, they will take advantage of it."

In a letter to ABCFM corresponding secretary Dr. Judson Smith of 13 November 1900 (received by Smith on 7 January 1901), Ament wrote:

Apparently, the actions of Russian, French, and German soldiers, "who looted and killed on every hand, often taking delight in shooting every person visible ... determined Dr. Ament not to go again with soldiers in his efforts to secure the replacing of the Christian in their homes, or to enforce the reasonable demands for indemnity for the great losses sustained by the church-members." Ament wrote in a letter on 27 September 1900, about a month after the occupation of the Mongol Fu (palace): "I am selling off the bric-a-brac, silks, furs found in the Fu for the benefit of the Christians."

Ament, writing to Rev. Dr. Judson Smith on 27 December 1900, before he became aware of any criticism, gave this account of the collection of indemnities:

Criticisms of Ament and his actions

Wilbur Chamberlin and New York Sun article (24 December 1900)
Chamberlin had first met Ament in Beijing on 14 October 1900. In a letter to his wife, Chamberlin indicated:

While Chamberlin thought it unlikely that the Sun publish his reports about the looting by missionaries and their followers, he felt that should they be printed that he would be:

Chamberlin's report was subsequently published in the Christmas Eve 1900 edition of New York's The Sun newspaper. Chamberlin reported:

Chamberlin indicated in a letter to his wife dated 28 December 1900, that he had interviewed Ament that day about missionary looting, and that Ament believed he had done nothing for which he was ashamed. Chamberlin confided to his wife that:

In a subsequent letter to his wife, dated 29 January 1901, Chamberlin indicates that:

Mark Twain: "To the Person Sitting in Darkness" (February 1901)
Mark Twain was "an outspoken critic of American involvement in the Philippines and China", and "one of the mammoth figures in anti-imperialism, and certainly the foremost anti-imperialist literary figure" of his days, having become in January 1901 a vice president of the Anti-Imperialist League of New York.

Twain decided to use the Sun article as the basis of a sustained attack on both the missionary enterprise and its imperialist tendencies. "Twain lampooned missionary morality and likened it to questionable American activities in the Philippines". According to Foner, Twain used the conduct of Ament to "drive home the point that the missionary movement served as a front for imperialism. "Without any doubt 'To the Person Sitting in Darkness' is Twain's most famous anti-imperialist piece. The satire is incredibly dark and Twain does not hesitate to taunt those whom he considers to be immoral including McKinley as the "Master of the Game," the missionaries, and the trusts." The title of the article is "an ironic reference to Matthew 4:16 — "The people who sat in darkness have seen a great light"",  "and used by the Christian missionaries when referring to the "savage", "heathen", "uncivilized" populations of the lands the imperialists were conquering." It was also a response the pro-imperialistic message in the poem The White Man's Burden written by Rudyard Kipling in response to the American annexation of the Philippines.F The title was "a play upon the idea of western civilization being "enlightened"". Kipling had used the image when he wrote of:

In this article, Twain especially targeted Ament. According to Susan Harris:

According to Twain biographer Albert Bigelow Paine:

James Smylie somewhat whitewashed the controversy, saying, "Twain went after the respected Congregationalist minister, Reverend William Scott Ament, director of the American Board of Commissioners for Foreign Missions. Ament joined other powers in seeking indemnities from the Chinese after the Boxer Rebellion against western exploitation in 1900. Twain, perhaps unfairly, was shocked that Ament would use such blood money for the "propagation of the Gospel" and to promote the "blessings of civilization" to brothers and sisters who "sit in darkness." He summoned to missionaries: Come home and Christianize Christians in the states!"

Reactions to the controversy
After its publication in The North American Review for February 1901, as the opening article, there was a huge controversy. This article "created a national sensation as well as a savage debate between Twain and the American Board of Foreign Missions; it is a masterful and satiric polemic condemning imperialism and the West for military intervention in China, South Africa, and the Philippines." According to Paine:

After its magazine publication, the Anti-Imperialist League of New York published the essay as a pamphlet and seems to have distributed as many as 125,000 copies. However:

Critics of Ament

The New York Times
On 26 January 1901, the editor of The New York Times, in an editorial entitled "Loot and Indemnity in China", after describing the "various unprovoked and unpunished acts of murder, arson, robbery and rape" by the Allied forces, attacked the missionaries in China as "the most vociferous plauditors of the operations, the most implacable demanders of Chinese blood" and indicated that "the accounts that have reached us have represented the missionaries as having been as active in the looting of Chinese property as they had been in instigating the promiscuous taking of Chinese lives."

Ament was arrested by German and French troops near Tungchow, and charged with trying to extort money from the Chinese villagers. On 5 February 1901, The New York Times reported that Ament had been arrested (along with two British subjects) on a charge of "endeavoring to extort money from the Chinese villagers" near Tungchow (now the Tongzhou District, Beijing). While the two British subjects were released, Ament was held pending an appeal to United States Minister Edwin H. Conger. Two days later, The Times reported that Ament "had been arrested by French and German officers on the painful charge of blackmailing Chinese villages.... The charge has terrible plausibility. Apparently the only relevant answer the inculpated missionary could make to the charge is the ancient rejoinder "You're another," which the other doubtless was. But what a predicament for a missionary to be placed in with reference to avowed looters."

The New York Times, in an editorial of 7 February 1901, echoed the previous criticisms of Ament: "The plain fact is that the ministers of the gospel of  have been a disturbing factor in the Chinese situation." Quoting the opinion of then British Prime Minister, the Earl of Salisbury, who indicated that "missionaries in general have been an international nuisance", The Times indicated that "the missionaries in China were showing a vindictiveness, in respect to the outrages and the situation which did not exactly comport with the Gospel they professed to be spreading."  The Times concludes: "Upon the whole, it seems safe to say, that the Rev, Mr. Ament has missed his vocation, and that, for the particular function which incumbed on him, of propagating the Christian Gospel in foreign parts, he was not the most eligible person that could have been imagined or even secured."

Ament was subsequently released at the direction of the German military commander, Count Alfred von Waldersee. Wilbur Chamberlin, a reporter for the New York Sun, sent to China, reported in a letter dated 9 February 1901 to his wife:

Chamberlin indicated that the French and Germans, under pressure from the Americans, released him, insisting that he was never under arrest.

On 31 March 1901, the New York Times reported that the collection of "private indemnities" by Ament and others in China might disqualify them from any claim for payments when the United States government tendered its indemnity claims on China. It further indicated that the United States government could not make any claims for Chinese Christians as they were not American citizens, and that "Dr. Ament's recent complaint that the powers would do nothing in the way of collecting indemnity for these Christian Chinamen has not tended to raise the estimate of missionary intelligence among diplomats here [Washington D.C.]".

Thomas F. Millard
Ardent anti-imperialist American war correspondent Thomas Franklin Fairfax Millard (born 1868; died 8 September 1942 in Seattle, Washington), considered "the founding father of American journalism in China" who later "probably has had a greater influence on contemporary newspaper journalism than any other American journalist in China", then a special correspondent for the New York Herald in China since 1900, who also had his reports published in Britain's  The Daily Mail, and American magazines including Scribner's Magazine and The Cosmopolitan, and the English-language Kobe Weekly Chronicle of Japan, criticised Ament for his actions on the military expedition to San Ho in September 1900. Millard charged in Scribner's Magazine that the allied insistence on revenge was criminal. "Seized with a vertigo of indiscriminating vengeance, the powers are trifling with the peace of the world. Events such as the months of September, October and November brought to China have carried war back to the Dark Ages, and will leave a taint in the moral atmosphere of the world for a generation to come". Upon his return to the United States in January 1901, in response to a letter urging the editor of The New York Times to retract his editorial of 26 January 1901 on "Loot and Indemnity in China", Millard wrote:

Supporters of Ament attributed Millard's critique to prejudice. For example, ABCFM missionary George D. Wilder in writing to Rev. Judson Smith, secretary of the ABCFM, indicated:

One of Millard's protégés, Edgar Snow, described Millard's "anti-colonial, anti-imperialist, pro-independence, pro-equality of nations, pro-Republican, pro-self-determination and very pro-American [views.]."

Other Critics
John Ames Mitchell wrote sarcastically in his Life magazine that "The Rev. Ament seems to be a good collector. When he gets out of his Chinese scrape he ought to be able to find a place in the Tammany police force.... Mark Twain had hung up the hide of the Reverend Ament, missionary in China." Charles Fletcher Lummis, editor of The Land of Sunshine, agreed with Twain's assessment of the situation: "Dr. Ament, American missionary to China, who extorted from innocent paupers a manifold retribution in blood and money for the sins of the Boxers."

In the eighth series of Ethical Addresses (1901), after referring to "Ament and his pious frauds", Ament's motivations are explored: "It is because the Rev. Mr. Ament loved his church and her temporal possessions more than ... ethical principles.... It is because men love their churches more than righteousness that iniquities done in the name of the church are condoned." In the same publication, however, referring to Ament: "The truth of the matter is, that the missionary has been made the scapegoat by conspiring and corrupt native officials, and by immoral foreigners now in China and their ignorant brethren here in the United States."

The Socialist Party of America supported Twain's attack on Ament and the other missionaries in an editorial in the 29 April 1901 edition of the Daily People by Daniel De Leon:

Supporters of Ament
The reaction among the missionaries, and proponents of imperialism was swift and predictable. They charged Twain with treason. "Twain's caustic indictment generated, in turn, a defensive apologetics on the part of the American Board of Commissioners for Foreign Missions. Both Judson Smith and Gilbert Reid claimed that missionary looting was "high ethics," and added that American missionaries had only looted to provide money for the relief of Chinese Christians."

Judson Smith
Rev. Dr. Judson Smith (born 28 June 1837 in Middlefield, Massachusetts; died 29 June 1906 in Roxbury, Massachusetts), who had been one of Ament's professors at Oberlin College, the corresponding secretary of Ament's sponsoring mission (1884–1906), The American Board of Commissioners for Foreign Missions (ABCFM), in letters to both the New York Herald and Tribune in February 1901 denied the accuracy of the Sun clipping of 24 December 1900, indicating that the cable report had "grossly exaggerated" the amount of Mr. Ament's collections. Instead of thirteen times the indemnity it should have read "one and a third times" the indemnity. Further, Smith defended Ament, declaring that Ament had suffered in the Boxer Rebellion and that Twain's "brilliant article would produce an effect quite beyond the reach of plain argument", and that it would do an innocent man an injustice. Smith demanded an apology from Twain. Replying in a letter to the New York Tribune, Twain insisted that Ament had arraigned himself.

Gilbert Reid
Rev. Gilbert Reid (born 29 November 1857; died 1927) (founder of the Mission among the Higher Classes in China (MHCC)) wrote an article entitled "The Ethics of Loot" in the July edition of Forum, in which he justified the motives and methods of the missionaries in collecting indemnities.

North China Mission
At the end of January 1901 fourteen members of the North China Mission of the ABCFM endorsed the actions of Ament and Tewksbury: "Voted, That Dr. Ament and Mr. Tewksbury were justified in the following the advice of the United States Minister and selling the moveable property in the Tau-lu-po-fu and the Yu-wang-fu for the benefit of the distressed Chinese refugees and for the extraordinary expenses after the siege was raised...."

Peking Missionary Society
On 21 March 1901, the Peking Missionary Association demanded Twain retract the statements he made attacking Ament in the February issue of The North American Review "concerning monies he collected from rural Chinese in payment for properties destroyed and people killed during the Boxer rebellion." The PMA secretary cabled the editor of The North American Review: "Peking Missionary Association demands public retraction. Mark Twain's gross libel against Ament utterly false. Secretary."

Twain indicated that he could not comment for publication, but would respond in the April edition of The North American Review. His representative indicated: "He hopes that both the Peking Missionary Association and the American Board of Foreign Missions will like it, but he has his doubts."

George D. Wilder
George D. Wilder, an ABCFM colleague of Ament in China, wrote in a letter to Judson Smith on 25 March 1901:

Boston Journal
Ament was not just defended by his colleagues or other Christian organisations. An editorial in the Boston Journal, entitled "A Humorist Astray", defends Ament:

Henry Stimson
Prominent New York lawyer, and future United States Secretary of State, Henry Stimson, responding to a New York Times editorial criticising Ament and the other missionaries in China, wrote in a letter published in The Times on 21 March 1901:

Edwin Conger
Edwin Hurd Conger (7 March 1843 – 18 May 1907), the United States Minister to China (1898–1905), consistently defended the actions of Ament and the other missionaries. For example, on 25 April 1901, The New York Times reprinted an interview with Conger, originally conducted in Kobe, Japan on 6 April 1901 while both men were en route to the United States. Conger defended the actions of Ament, indicating confiscated goods had been sold to ensure the survival of Chinese Christians. Conger indicated that the missionaries "only appropriated their property for justifiable ends."

On the same day a Boston newspaper reported: "Dr. Ament explains the sale of goods in the Mongol prince's house in which he took up his quarters by saying that those with him were without food and that he sold the goods on the advice of Mr. Conger. Had they not taken possession of the place it would have been destroyed by the Russians. The amount realized by the sale was devoted to the needs of the native Christians." The same despatch quoting from Mr. Conger says:

Claude Maxwell MacDonald
Colonel Sir Claude Maxwell MacDonald (1852–1915), the chief British diplomat in Beijing during the Boxer Uprising, and the commander of the defence of the besieged foreign legations, also defended the missionaries:

Charles Denby
Charles Harvey Denby (1830–1904), the United States Minister to China (1885–1898) in his posthumously published China and Her People (1905), supported Ament directly and criticised Twain implicitly: "The raid made on Doctor Ament some years ago is an example of how incautious people, who especially yearn to be funny, handle this subject.... Doctor Ament's conduct was in accordance with Chinese" customs.

Newspaper Retractions
During the controversy, both The New York Times and the New York Sun issued corrections.

The New York Times
On 17 February 1901, The New York Times issued a retraction after receiving a different account of Ament's actions from Dr Judson Smith of the ABCFM, based on Ament's letter of 13 November 1900 to Smith. NYT reported that in Ament's own letter he indicated the compensation for the losses of the converts obtained by him had been "by appealing to the sense of justice among the villages where our people had lived." NYT concluded: "It seems that we have been led into doing an injustice to him.... In that case we have to express our sincere regret."

New York Sun
On 5 March 1901, Wilbur Chamberlin, the journalist who started the controversy, telegraphed to the New York Sun the following, which appeared in that paper under the heading: "A Clean Bill for the Missionaries":

Also in March, the Sun printed an interview with Ament that indicated that the indemnity was not thirteen times the loss, but only one and one-third of the loss.

"To My Missionary Critics" (April 1901)
Twain apparently "liked the attention he was getting and wrote to a correspondent that he was in "hot water with the clergy and other goody-goody people, but I am enjoying it more than I have ever enjoyed hot water before." In response to an open letter from the ABCFM demanding an apology, Twain penned "To My Missionary Critics", which offered no apologies, although it ended by acknowledging that missionaries no doubt mean well. The essay, originally entitled "The Case of Rev. Dr. Ament, Missionary", was published in the North American Review in April 1901. According to Fitch, "To My Missionary Critics" (1901) recapitulates the charges mounted against Reverend William Ament in "To the Person Sitting in Darkness" and underscores Twain's contempt for the American-Christian missionaries' role in imperialism.

Twain explored the delicate moral difference between a demand thirteen times as great as it should be and a demand that was only one and a third times the correct amount. As Paine explains: "The point had been made by the board that it was the Chinese custom to make the inhabitants of a village responsible for individual crimes; and custom, likewise, to collect a third in excess of the damage, such surplus having been applied to the support of widows and orphans of the slain converts."

Focusing on the exaggerated indemnity, Twain said:

In this article, Twain offered some further illustrations, including the "Tale of a King and His Treasure" and another tale entitled "The Watermelons". Twain wrote:

Ament's Response
When Ament became aware of the criticism of his activities and the subsequent controversy, he was affected adversely. Ament admitted the strain in a letter to his wife on Sunday, 27 January 1901: "I am doing what I do not recall that I ever did before, remaining at home deliberately and missing all the services. I need the rest and felt that it was imperative. You see there is no let up for me. It is a constant strain from morning till night." Missionary colleague Nellie Naomi Russell (born 31 March 1862 in Ontonagon, Michigan; died 22 August 1911 in China) records:

After Twain's initial article, ABCFM secretary Judson Smith wrote to Agent, and enquired as to the propriety of missionaries collecting indemnity; Ament and Tewksbury both replied that the Chinese themselves preferred this to being subjected to extortionate measures from local officials. Additionally, Ament and Tewksbury indicated that their activities had been approved by the other missionaries. Ament indicated in a letter to his wife on 18 February 1901:

Ament left Beijing on 26 March 1901 to return to the United States to make his case, clear his name and defend the reputation of the other missionaries. On 1 April 1901, Ament, refusing to be a scapegoat in the affair, cabled the following to the ABCFM: "Nothing has been done except after consultation with colleagues and the full approval of the United States Minister. I will secure a certificate from Mr. [Edwin H.] Conger to that effect."

On 30 March 1901, the New York Tribune, reported Ament's rationale for his actions:

Ament arrived back in the United States on 25 April 1901. On the same day, The New York Times reprinted an interview with Ament, originally conducted in Kobe, Japan on 6 April 1901 while Ament was en route to the United States. In this article, Ament admitted:

Ament only received $75 from the British Loot Committee. Previous to this, a sale of garments and curios was held, and the $400 netted was given to the American Board of Foreign Missions, "with which Dr. Ament is connected. Dr. Ament explained that from the sale of goods plundered from the Mongol Prince's house only $4000 was realized, and this was devoted to the needs of the native Christians."

In May 1901, Ament responded to his critics during a brief visit to the United States of America in 1901 prior to his return to China. In response to the criticisms of Twain and others, Ament denied that the missionaries forced the Chinese to accept Christianity, and that: "We treat their beliefs kindly, try to extract the good, and never interfere with their customs, except where they interfere with Christianity."

In response to Twain's specific allegations, Ament said:

On 16 May 1901, Ament addressing guests at the third annual Asiatic Society of America dinner in New York, again defended himself and his fellow missionaries:

After Ament's death in January 1909, Judson Smith's successor, Dr.  James Levi Barton(1855–1936), wrote in an obituary published in The Congregationalist:
The cruel and baseless attack made upon him [Ament] in this country by Mark Twain, in 1901, left a deep wound in his heart, in spite of the fact that it was clearly shown that his acts had been above criticism. He said one night, as we were sitting in a Chinese inn upon our way to Shansi, "I presume there are many in the United States who regard me as little better than a thief and a robber." I tried to assure him that no missionary was more honored than he, none more absolutely trusted, as it had been proven that the charges had no foundation in fact. He replied, "That is true, but do the people believe the proof, and will the truth ever catch up with the charge?"

Further responses
By the end of May 1901, ABCFM board secretary Judson Smith silenced Ament, as he believed further comments were damaging Ament and his colleagues. Smith attempted a final defence of Ament and the other missionaries in May in an essay entitled "The Missionaries and Their Critics".

Arthur Henderson Smith
"Somewhat at a disadvantage in this exchange, missionary leaders nevertheless attempted to influence opinion in treaty port China; Arthur Smith joined Reid and Judson Smith in writing letters to the North-China Herald justifying missionary actions and criticizing Twain." In a letter to the ABCFM, which was in part published in the 5 May 1901 edition of the New York Times, Arthur Henderson Smith, writing from Beijing, defends Ament:

Smith, in his China in Convulsion (1901) indicated:

Smith continued:

Assessment of Ament

"Twain had considerable popular support, and he did not budge from his positions, but forthrightly defended them in speeches and articles over the next several years." In a letter to his best friend, congregational clergyman Rev. Joseph Twichell, in June 1901, Twain was unrepentant, referring to:

A recent biography portrays Ament in a sympathetic light but concludes that he was:

Consequences
In October 1901, the Foreign Christian Missionary Society held Mark Twain's attack on Ament responsible for its decrease in income. However, E. E. Strong of Ament's own mission board, the American Board of Commissioners for Foreign Missions, indicated that Twain's attacks actually helped the ABCFM financially:

References

Sources and further reading

Articles

Contemporaneous (1877–1910)
 American Asiatic Association. Journal of the American Asiatic Association 2 (1901–1902):10. John Foord, 1901.
 American Home Missionary Association, and Congregational Home Missionary Society. The Home Missionary 74–76 (1901–1903):7. Executive Committee of the American Home Missionary Society, 1902.
 American Missionary Association, and Congregational Home Missionary Society. The American Missionary (1901):198.
 Barton, James L. "An Appreciation of Dr. Ament". Missionary Herald (February 1909).
 Bellamy, Francis Rufus. Article in New Outlook. Outlook Publishing Company, Inc., 1901. See pages 377–388 for Ament.
 Brotherhood of Locomotive Firemen (U.S.). Locomotive Firemen's Magazine. Vol. 31. Brotherhood of Locomotive Fireman, 1901. Page 292.
 Chautauqua Institution. The Chautauquan 34 (1902):13. Chautauqua Literary and Scientific Circle, 1902.
 Conant, William Cowper, ed. "Justice to the Missionaries in China." Salvation: A New Evangelical Monthly 3 (1901):205.
 De Leon, Daniel. "Mark Twain on Missionaries." Daily People 1:303 (29 April 1901):1. online: .
 Episcopal Church Board of Missions. The Spirit of Missions 73 (1908):630. Episcopal Church Domestic and Foreign Missionary Society. J.L. Powell, 1908.
 Fenn, Courtenay H. "In the Matter of Loot". The Presbyterian Banner. 11 April 1901.
 Fibre & Fabric: A Record of American Textile Industries in the Cotton and Woolen Trade 33 (1901). Details arrest of Ament.
 General Convention of the Christian Church. Herald of Gospel Liberty 112:1–26 (1920):515. Christian Pub. Association, 1920.
 "The Giant Awakened", Gleanings in Bee Culture 37 (1909):23ff. Published by A. I. Root Co., 1909. Article on Ament with reference to his pastorate in Medina, Ohio.
 Gilman, Daniel Coit; Harry Thurston Peck; and Frank Moore Colby. "William Scott Ament", 435. In The New International Encyclopaedia. Dodd, Mead and Company, 1902.
 Hubbard, Elbert, ed. The Philistine: A Periodical of Protest. 14 (December 1901 – May 1902):88. Society of the Philistines (East Aurora, N.Y.).
 Literary Digest 23:2 (1901):36–37.
 Methodist Magazine and Review. Vol. 55 (January to June 1902). W. Briggs, 1902. See pages 377–378.
 Mind 9 (1901–1902):100. Discusses Reid's Ethics of Loot.
 Mitchell, John Ames, ed. Life. Vol. 37 (1901). Page 298.
 Post, Louis Freeland; Alice Thatcher Post; and Stoughton Cooley. The Public. Vol. 3. Louis F. Post, 1900. Page 724.
 Reid, Gilbert. "The Ethics of the Last War," Forum 32 (1902):446–55.
 Reid, Gilbert. "The Ethics of Loot," Forum 31:5 (July 1901):581–86.
 Reid, Gilbert. North-China Herald, (27 March 1901):602–3.
 Shaw, Albert. The American Monthly Review of Reviews 23 (1901):748.
 Smith, Arthur Henderson. North-China Herald (19 June 1901):1193–94.
 Smith, Judson. "The Missionaries and their Critics," North American Review 172 (May 1901):724–733.
 Smith, Judson. North-China Herald (3 April 1901):660–61.
 Smylie, James H. "The Preacher: Mark Twain and Slaying Christians". Theology Today (January 2001). 
 Society for the Propagation of the Gospel in Foreign Parts (Great Britain). The East and the West. 6 (1908):146. Society for the Propagation of the Gospel in Foreign Parts., 1908.
 Twain, Mark. "To My Missionary Critics". The North American Review 172 (April 1901):520. On-line: 
 Twain, Mark. "To the Person Sitting in Darkness". The North American Review 172 (February 1901):161. On-line: 
 United Free Church of Scotland Women's Foreign Mission. The Women's Missionary Magazine of the United Free Church of Scotland No. 1-24 (1901–1902): 43. Publications Office [United Free Church], 1901.
 United States War Dept. Report of the Lieutenant-General Commanding the Army, in Seven Parts: Military Operations in China. 1900. See page 138 for reference to Ament.
 University of Chicago. The University Record. Vol. 6. University of Chicago, 1901. Page 335.
 Wilder, G. D. "Wm. Scott Ament," Chinese Recorder (May 1909):276–81.

Recent
 李佳白与尚贤堂—清末民初在华传教士活动个案研究 ["Gilbert Reid and the International Institute of China: A Case Study of Foreign Missionary Activities in Late Qing and Early Republic China".] Journal of Historical Science (September 2005). ISSN 0583-0214(2005)09-0057-06.
 Gibson, William M. "Mark Twain and Howells: Anti-Imperialists." The New England Quarterly (December 1947): 435ff.
 Hevia, James L. "Leaving a Brand on China: Missionary Discourse in the Wake of the Boxer Movement," Modern China 18:3 (July 1992).
 Hevia, James L. "Looting Beijing, 1860, 1900", 192–213, in Tokens of Exchange: The Problem of Translation in Global Circulations. Edited by Lydia He Liu. Duke University Press, 1999.
 Hevia, James L. "Loot's Fate: The Economy of Plunder and the Moral Life of Objects from the Summer Palace of the Emperor of China." History and Anthropology, 6:4 (1994):319–345.
 Hunt, Michael H. "The Forgotten Occupation: Peking, 1900–1901." The Pacific Historical Review 48:4 (November 1979):501–529.
 Kinch, J. C. B. "Europe and Elsewhere", in The Mark Twain Encyclopedia. Page 261.
 King, H. H. "The Boxer Indemnity: 'Nothing but Bad'" Modern Asian Studies 40:3 (2006):663–689.
 Maier-Katkin, Birgit and Daniel Maier-Katkin. "At the Heart of Darkness: Crimes Against Humanity and the Banality of Evil". Human Rights Quarterly 26:3 (August 2004):584–604.
 Newman, Rhoda. "Mark Twain, Internationalist: Travel writer and diplomat wannabe waxes satirically on envoys, imperialism." Foreign Service Journal (February 1996):18–23; http://www.twainweb.net/filelist/intl01.html.
 Scully, Eileen P. "Taking the Low Road to Sino-American Relations: "Open Door" Expansionists and the Two China Markets". The Journal of American History 82:1 (June 1995):62–83. Discusses Reid's "Ethics of Looting".
 Titta, R. "Mark Twain and the Onset of the Imperialist Period." The Internationalist (September–October 1997). 
 Tsou Mingteh. "Christian Missionary as Confucian Intellectual: Gilbert Reid (1857–1927) and the Reform Movement in the Late Qing", 73–90. In Christianity in China, ed. Daniel H. Bays. Stanford University Press, 1999.

Books

Contemporaneous (1877–1950)
 Allen, Roland. The Siege of the Peking Legations: Being the Diary of the Rev. Roland Allen ... With Maps and Plans. Smith, Elder, 1901. Page 23.
 American Council of Learned Societies Devoted to Humanistic Studies, Dictionary of American Biography. Volume 1. New York: Charles Scribner's Sons, 1964. See page 241 for article on Ament.
 Barton, James L. The Missionary and His Critics. New York, NY: Fleming H. Revell Company, 1906.
 Beach, Harlan Page. A Geography and Atlas of Protestant Missions: Their Environment, Forces, Distribution, Methods, Problems, Results and Prospects at the Opening of the Twentieth Century. Vol. 1. Student Volunteer Movement for Foreign Missions, 1901. Page 290.
 Carus, Paul. The Open Court: Devoted to the Science of Religion, the Religion of Science, and the Extension of the Religious Parliament Idea. The Open Court Pub. Co., 1901. Page 329.
 Chamberlin, Georgia Louise, ed. Ordered to China: Letters of Wilbur J. Chamberlin Written from China While Under Commission from the New York Sun During the Boxer Uprising of 1900 and the International Complications which Followed. F. A. Stokes company, 1903.  Chamberlin sent the initial despatch that fueled the Indemnity Controversy between Twain and Ament.
 Clark, Francis Edward. Memories of Many Men in Many Lands: An Autobiography. United Society of Christian Endeavor, 1922.
 Coleman, George William. Searchlights. Arakelyan Press, 1909. Page 85.
 Conger, Sarah Pike. Letters from China: With Particular Reference to the Empress Dowager and the Women of China. A.C. McClurg & Co., 1910.
 Cromer, Jeremiah C. "William S Ament: An Ideal Missionary". Pamphlet, Envelope Series 12, no. 2 (July 1909).
 Denby, Charles. China and Her People: Being the Observations, Reminiscences, and Conclusions of an American Diplomat. L.C. Page & company, 1905. Denby defends Ament's role in collecting indemnities after the Boxer Uprising. See pages 217–218.
 Dickinson, Goldsworthy Lowes. The International Anarchy, 1904–1914. 1926.
 Dickinson, Goldsworthy Lowes. Letters from John Chinaman and Other Essays. 1901.
 Fullerton, William Young and Charles Edward Wilson. New China: A Story of Modern Travel. Morgan and Scott, 1932. Page 129.
 Gamewell, Mary Porter and Alexander Harrison Tuttle. Mary Porter Gamewell and Her Story of the Siege in Peking. Eaton & Mains, 1907.
 Griffis, William Elliot. China's Story: In Myth, Legend, And Annals. Rev. ed. Boston and New York: Houghton Mifflin, 1935.
 Harrison, Frederic. "The Religion of Duty", in Ethical Addresses. Vol. 8. American Ethical Union. S. Burns Weston, 1901. Pages 35, 92–93.
 Ketler, Isaac Conrad. The Tragedy of Paotingfu: An Authentic Story of the Lives, Services and Sacrifices of the Presbyterian, Congregational and China Inland Missionaries who Suffered Martyrdom at Paotingfu, China, 30 June and 1 July 1900. Revell, 1902.
 Latourette, Kenneth Scott. A History of Christian Missions in China. The Macmillan company, 1929.
 Lobenstein, Edwin Carlyle et al., eds. The China Christian Year Book. Kwang Hsüeh, 1910. Page viii.
 Lumis, Charles Fletcher. The Land of Sunshine. Vol. 14. F.A. Pattee, 1901. Page 237.
 McIntosh, Gilbert. Is There Anything in It?: Some After-crisis Vindications. Morgan & Scott, 1902. Pages 48–56.
 Mateer, Ada Haven. Siege Days: Personal Experiences of American Women and Children During the Peking Siege. Fleming H. Revell, 1903.
 Mather, Amasa Stone. Extracts from the Letters, Diary and Note Books of Amasa Stone Mather: June 1907 to December 1908. Vol. 2. Privately printed by the Arthur H. Clark Co., 1910. See page 40.
 Memoriam William Scott Ament, 1851–1909: Memorial Addresses, Tungchou, 1909, 47pp. 
 Miner, Luella. China's Book of Martyrs: A Record of Heroic Martyrdoms and Marvelous Deliverances of Chinese Christians During the Summer of 1900. Jennings and Pye, 1903. Pages 79, 243.
 Morrison, George Ernest. The Correspondence of G.E. Morrison. Vol. 1: 1895–1912. Ed., Hui-min Lo. CUP Archive, 1976.
 National Council of the Congregational Churches in the United States. Addresses, Reports, Statements of Benevolent Societies, Constitution, Minutes, Roll of Delegates, Etc. Vol. 12. Congregational Churches in the United States National Council, 1904. Page 209.
 Oberlin College. "Annual Reports". (September 1908 – October 1909):384–385.
 Paine, Albert Bigelow. Mark Twain: A Biography: The Personal and Literary Life of Samuel Langhorne Clemens. "Mark Twain and the Missionaries." Chapter CCXIV.  
 Porter, Henry Dwight. William Scott Ament: Missionary of the American Board to China. Revell, 1911. On-line:
 Roberts, James Hudson. A Flight for Life and an Inside View of Mongolia. The Pilgrim press, 1903. Page 31.
 Rose, Martha Emily Parmelee. The Western Reserve of Ohio and Some of Its Pioneers, Places and Women's Clubs, National American Woman Suffrage Association Collection. Euclid Print. Co., 1914. See page 133.
 Rowe, Henry Kalloch. History of Andover Theological Seminary. n.p., 1933. Ament is described as a distinguished alumnus.
 Russell, Nellie Naomi. Gleanings from Chinese Folklore: With some of her stories of life in China, to which are added memorial sketches of the author from associates and friends.. Comp. Mary Harriet Porter. Chicago: Fleming H. Revell, 1915. Page 34.
 Shaw, William. The Evolution of an Endeavorer: An Autobiography. Boston: Christian Endeavor World, 1924. See pages 227–228, 319–320.
 Smith, Stanley Peregrine . China from Within: Or, The Story of the Chinese Crisis. Marshall Bros., 1901.
 Twain, Mark. Mark Twain: Collected Tales, Sketches, Speeches, and Essays: Volume 2: 1891–1910. Library of America, 1992.
 William Scott Ament: Addresses Given at the Memorial Services Held at Teng Shih K'ou Congregational Church, Peking, China, Sunday, February Fourteenth, Nineteen Hundred Nine. North China Union College Press, 1909.
 Wolferstan, Bertram. The Catholic Church in China from 1860 to 1907. Sands & Co., 1909. See pages 35–36.

Recent
 Austin, Alvyn. China's Millions: The China Inland Mission and Late Qing Society, 1832–1905. Wm. B. Eerdmans Publishing, 2007.
 Barlow, Tani E. Formations of Colonial Modernity in East Asia. Duke University, 1997. Page 126.
 Bickers, Robert A. and R. G. Tiedemann. The Boxers, China, and the World. Rowman & Littlefield, 2007. , .
 Chamberlain, E. Russell. Loot!: The Heritage of Plunder. New York: Facts on File, 1983.
 Chʼên, Jerome. China and the West: Society and Culture, 1815–1937. Indiana University Press, 1979. Discusses ethics of looting.
 Cohen, Paul A. History in Three Keys: The Boxers as Event, Experience, and Myth. Columbia University Press, 1997.
 Deane, Hugh. Good Deeds & Gunboats: Two Centuries of American-Chinese Encounters. China Books & Periodicals, 1990. See page 66 for the Ament-Twain controversy.
 Edwards, Dwight Woodbridge. Yenching University. United Board for Christian Higher Education in Asia, 1959. Pages 13, 34.
 Elliott, Jane E. Some Did it for Civilisation, Some Did it for Their Country: A Revised View of the Boxer War. Chinese University Press, 2002.
 Emerson, Everett H. Mark Twain: A Literary Life. University of Pennsylvania Press, 2000. Page 257.
 Esherick, Joseph W. The Origins of the Boxer Uprising. University of California Press, 1988. Page 310 for missionary looting.
 Ewing, Charles Edward; and Bessie Smith Ewing. Death Throes of a Dynasty: Letters and Diaries of Charles and Bessie Ewing, Missionaries to China. Ed. E. G. Ruoff. Kent State University Press, 1990.
 Falkenstine, Mike. The Chinese Puzzle: Putting the Pieces Together for a Deeper Understanding of China and Her Church. Xulon Press, 2008. See page 29 for references to missionary looting defended.
 Foner, Philip Sheldon. Mark Twain: Social Critic. International Publishers, 1958. See page 280.
 Geismar, Maxwell David. Mark Twain: An American Prophet. Houghton Mifflin, 1970. See 207–209 for analysis of Twain's attack on Ament.
 Greene, Felix. A Curtain of Ignorance: How the American Public Has Been Misinformed about China. Doubleday, 1964.
 Greenlee, James Grant and Charles Murray Johnston. Good Citizens: British Missionaries and Imperial States, 1870–1918. McGill-Queen's Press – MQUP, 1999. See pages 110–114 especially for missionaries as "good citizens" and indemnities.
 [Gu, Changsheng] [顾长声]. 从马礼逊到司徒雷登—来华新教传教士评传 [From Morrison to Stuart: Critical Reviews on Protestant Missionaries in China. 上海人民出版社 [Shanghai: Shanghai Renmin Chubanshe], 1985. Includes Ament.
 Harris, Susan K. "Mark Twain and America's Christian Mission Abroad", In A Companion to Mark Twain, eds. Peter Messent and Louis J. Budd. Blackwell, 2005. .
 Hevia, James L. English Lessons: The Pedagogy of Imperialism in Nineteenth-Century China. Duke University, 2003. See page 218 for account of Ament exacting indemnity in September 1900 and sanctioned "looting of several homes of the village".
 Hunter, Jane. The Gospel of Gentility: American Women Missionaries in Turn-of-the-Century China. Yale University Press, 1984.
 Laurence, Patricia Ondek, trans. Lily Briscoe's Chinese Eyes: Bloomsbury, Modernism, and China. University of South Carolina Press, 2003.
 Lodwick, Kathleen, ed. The "Chinese Recorder" Index: A Guide to Christian Missions in Asia, 1867–1941. Rowman & Littlefield, 1986. See index on page 7 for extensive list of articles by both William & Mary Ament.
 Lutz, Jesse Gregory. China and the Christian Colleges, 1850–1950. Cornell University Press, 1971.
 Martin, William Alexander Parsons. The Siege in Peking, China Against the World: By an Eye Witness. Adamant Media, 2002. See page 136 for reference to Ament.
 Miller, Stuart Creighton. "Ends and Means: Missionary Justification of Force in Nineteenth Century China," The Missionary Enterprise in China and America, ed. J.K. Fairbank (Cambridge, MA: Harvard University Press, 1974):249–282.
 Oggel, L. Terry. "American Board of Foreign Missions", p. 23. In The Mark Twain Encyclopedia, edited by J. R. LeMaster; James Darrell Wilson; and Christie Graves Hamric. Taylor & Francis, .
 Olson, James Stuart; Robert Shadle; Ross Marlay; William Ratliff; and Joseph M. Rowe, eds. Historical Dictionary of European Imperialism. Greenwood Publishing Group, 1991. Pages 73–74 for Boxer Rebellion, 128–130 for "China".
 Phipps, William E. Mark Twain's Religion. Mercer University Press, 2003.
 Preston, Diana. Besieged in Peking: The Story of the 1900 Boxer Rising. Constable, 1999. Page 69.
 Preston, Diana. The Boxer Rebellion: The Dramatic Story of China's War on Foreigners that Shook the World in the Summer of 1900. Walker, 2000; See page 395. Berkley Books, 2001. See page 291 for a description of missionary "looting".
 Reinders, Eric Robert. Borrowed Gods and Foreign Bodies: Christian Missionaries Imagine Chinese Religion. University of California Press, 2004.
 Scully, Eileen P. Bargaining with the State from Afar: American Citizenship in Treaty Port China, 1844–1942. Columbia University Press, 2001. Discusses Reid's "The Ethics of Looting".
 Shavit, David. The United States in Asia: A Historical Dictionary. Greenwood, 1990. See pages 6–7 for an article on Ament.
 Strong, William Ellsworth. The Story of the American Board: An Account of the First Hundred Years of the American Board for Foreign Missions. Arno Press, 1969.
 Thompson, Larry Clinton. William Scott Ament and the Boxer Rebellion: Heroism, Hubris and the Ideal Missionary. McFarland & Company, March 2009.
 Varg, Paul A. Missionaries, Chinese, and Diplomats: The American Protestant Missionary Movement in China, 1890–1952. Princeton University Press, 1958. See page 49, n.35 for discussion of Twain & Ament.
 Young, Marilyn Blatt. The Rhetoric of Empire: American China Policy, 1895–1901. Harvard University Press, 1969.
 Zwick, Jim. Confronting Imperialism: Essays on Mark Twain and the Anti-Imperialist League. Infinity Publishing, November 2007.
 Zwick, Jim, ed. Mark Twain's Weapons of Satire: Anti-Imperialist Writings on the Philippine-American War. Syracuse University Press, 1992.

Audiobooks

Dissertations and Theses
 Wong, Lai Hang. "Protestant Missionary Concepts of and Revolutions in China, 1895–1911." A Dissertation. Presented to the Faculty of Arts in partial fulfillment of the requirements for the Master of Arts, University of Hong Kong, 1976.

China–United States relations
1901 in the United States
1901 in China
1901 in international relations
Mark Twain